Mount Bockheim is a peak, 2749 m, at the northwest end of Maine Ridge in Royal Society Range. The peak is bordered north and south by Tedrow Glacier and Matataua Glacier. Named by Advisory Committee on Antarctic Names (US-ACAN) (1995) after James G. Bockheim, Department of Soil Science, University of Wisconsin, Madison, who made soil development studies of McMurdo Dry Valleys in 12 field seasons during the 1970s and 1980s.

Mountains of Victoria Land
Scott Coast